The Buurmester House (Danish: Buurmesters Gaard) is a Neoclassical property situated at Admiralgade 20 in central Copenhagen, Denmark. It is one of several buildings constructed by Ernst Burmeister as part of the rebuilding of the city following the Copenhagen Fire of 1795. It was listed in the Danish registry of protected buildings and places in 1959.

History

The site was in 1689 part of a larger property (then No. 201) owned by former president of Borgerretten (The Civic Court) Hans Hiort's widow. In 1756, it was as No. 236 jointly owned by wine merchant Hans Christian Reimer and former colonial governor of the Danish Gold Coast  Just Platfues.

The property was together with most of the other buildings in the area destroyed in the Copenhagen Fire of 1795. The large fire site was subsequently divided into two separate properties and sold to different buyers.  The larger corner property at the corner of Fortunstræde was as No. 236A sold to  master carpenter Johan Christopher Suhr (now Fortunstræde 1). The smaller property in Admiralgade was as No. 236A acquired by  master carpenter Ernst Burmeister. The current building was constructed by him in 1797–1798. He had in 1807 also constructed the more humble building around the corner at Fortunstræde 3. The property in Admiralgade was in the new cadastre of 1806 listed as No. 161. It was by then owned by a woman (probably a widow) named Liunge (Ljunge, Lunge).

The actor  (1780-1842) was among the residents from 1817 to 1821.

Architecture

Admiralgade 20 is constructed in brick with three storeys over a walk-out basement. The front is plastered and white-painted. It is finished by a yellow-painted belt course above the ground floor and a white-painted cornice under the roof. An inset band between the three central windows on the first and second floors, which originally featured a frieze similar to the ones seen on many of the surrounding buildings, is now inscribed with the name of the building ("Buurmesters Gaard").

The main entrance in the bay furthest to the right (north) is accessed via a steep flight of steps. The transom window features the house number]]. The door is topped by a hood mould supported by corbels. The basement entrance in the central bay was until 1870 also topped by a hood mould.

The building is via two diagonal bays attached to a narrow, parallel rear wing on the other side of an equally narrow courtyard. The courtyard is to the north bordered by Fortunstræde 1. The entire complex was listed in the Danish registry of protected buildings and places in 1945.

Today
The building was as of 2008  owned by Trekantområdets Ejendomsselskab. The basement contains a retail space.

References

External links

 Source

Listed residential buildings in Copenhagen
Neoclassical architecture in Copenhagen
Residential buildings completed in 1798
1798 establishments in Denmark